The National Library of The Gambia is located in Banjul, Gambia. The library was originally operated by the British Council till 1946 and was renamed to the National Library of The Gambia by 1971. The library is maintained and administered by The Gambia National Library Services Authority (GNLSA). As of 2016, the library had a collection of 115,500 books and 85 periodicals. It had more than 42 staff and more than 276 members.

The library was also made the official recorder of legal depository and principal Bibliographic Centre of the nation. Around 2,000 archived material are stored in the library, which caters mainly to The Gambia and its history. The library offers an adult library, children's library, bulk school lending service, mobile and mailbox service.

History
The library was originally operated by the British council till 1946 and was renamed to the National Library of The Gambia by 1971. The Gambia did not have any library on its own till 1962. Till then the library was the only one of its kind in the country other than the ones in schools, Government departments, missions houses and clubs. When the transfer took place, the library had a collection of 25,000 books and 500 monographs. Sally Njie was appointed Chief Librarian in 1963. The British Government donated £575,000 to The Gambia for maintaining the library in 1974. A new complex was built and the library was moved to the new building in 1976 by the Library Board Act. The library is maintained and administered by The Gambia National Library Services Authority (GNLSA). During the 70s, the collections in the library was nearly doubled. The Gambia Library Services Authority was established in 2009 by an Act in the parliament, which gave more powers and autonomy to the library. Book Aid International is the overseas partner of the library, in collaboration with whom, the library donated books to the medical branch of University of Gambia. The library acquires all its collections through donations, gifts, purchases, government agencies and survey.

According to the United Nations, as of 2013 an estimated 41 percent of adult Gambians are literate.

Services
As of 2016, the library had a collection of 115,500 books and 85 periodicals. The library is located in Reg Pye Lane in the capital city of Banjul. The library has facilities for photocopying, school service and has ISBN service and access to UNESCO publications. The library co-ordinates the library and information issues at the national level and can impose penalties for non-adherence. A branch of the library was opened in Brikama in Western Division in 1990. The library was also made the official recorder of legal depository and principal Bibliographic Centre of the nation. Around 2,000 archived material are stored in the library, which caters mainly to The Gambia and its history. The library offers an adult library, children's library, bulk school lending service, mobile and mailbox service. The library also stored major and historical maps of The Gambia and its towns, audio tapes and press cutting of major events in the history of the country.

See also 
 List of national libraries

References 

Gambia
Buildings and structures in Banjul
Libraries in the Gambia